Highway 1 is the Saskatchewan section of the Trans-Canada Highway mainland route. The highway traverses Saskatchewan from the western border with Alberta, from Highway 1, to the Manitoba border where it continues as PTH 1. The Trans-Canada Highway Act was passed on December 10, 1949. The Saskatchewan segment was completed August 21, 1957, and completely twinned on November 6, 2008. The speed limit along the majority of the route is 110 kilometres per hour (70 mph) with urban area thoroughfares slowing to a speed of 80–100 kilometres per hour (50–62 mph). Portions of the highway—the section through Swift Current, an  section east of Moose Jaw, and a  section between the West Regina Bypass and Balgonie—are controlled-access. Highway 1 serves as a major east-west transport route for commercial traffic. It is the main link between southern Saskatchewan's largest cities, and also serves as the province's main link to the neighbouring provinces of Alberta (to the west) and Manitoba (to the east).

The four-lane divided highway passes through three major urban centres of Saskatchewan, Regina, Moose Jaw and Swift Current. A site in the Western Hemisphere Shorebird Reserve Network, an internationally acclaimed shorebird conservation strategy, is at the village of Chaplin approximately equal distance between Swift Current and Moose Jaw. Located southwest of the Trans-Canada is the Cypress Hills Interprovincial Park, which features Fort Walsh and the highest elevation of Saskatchewan. Highway 1 traverses ranch lands, the Missouri Coteau topographical area, and rolling prairie agricultural plains.

The highway generally runs west to east along the route, following parallel with the transcontinental Canadian Pacific Railway route. The Trans-Canada Highway traverses historical settlement areas. The transcontinental railroad of 1885 brought settlers to southern Saskatchewan. Commemorative historical sites along the Trans-Canada Highway mark the historical changes of the 72 years since the CPR came through.

On November 9, 2011, the section between Moose Jaw and Regina was designated "Saskatchewan's Highway of Heroes" to honour province's soldiers who died in service

Origins

The Minister of Mines and Resources held the first Federal-Provincial Conference regarding the Trans-Canada Highway in December, 1948. With consent from all provinces, the Trans–Canada Highway Act was passed on December 10, 1949. Following this a second Federal-Provincial Conference was held to bring together the final details for the agreement. The Highway Act aims for the completion of the Trans–Canada Highway route by December, 1956. The third Federal-Provincial Conference hold April 25, 1950  saw Ontario, Manitoba, British Columbia, Prince Edward Island, Saskatchewan and Alberta sign the agreement which provided federal funding for the proposed transcontinental highway. The shortest and most practical routes could be chosen by each province respectively, given that provinces adjacent to one another agree on the meeting locations. As of 1950,  have been agreed to. By 1955, the Trans–Canada Highway program had only seen  of highway completed in areas outside of Quebec.   of the paved  of the Canadian highway Trans–Canada highway system had been completed by November 1, 1955 to Trans–Canada Highway standards. Premier T.C. Douglas presided over the opening ceremonies on August 21, 1957, opening the  Saskatchewan segment of the Trans–Canada Highway

The Special Projects Branch of the Department of Resources and Development administers the Trans–Canada highway Act checking specifications, and prior construction. The contributions from the Dominion Government to the provinces may be up to 50 per cent of the cost of construction approved by the Governor in council. The actual construction is controlled by each Provincial Highway Department respectively.

1957 saw the Saskatchewan portion of the Trans–Canada Highway come to completion, the first province to finish their section in Canada. The year 1962 saw the entire Canadian  highway completed which came to a total expenditure of $1.4 billion (about $18.26 billion today).  The last of the highway between Moosomin and Wapella was twinned and opened on November 6, 2008 providing a completely twinned corridor.  The total cost of twinning was $217 million with the Canadian government contributing $59 million.

History

A First Nation trail used by fur traders, and Red River carts pulling settlers effects was the first path between Moosomin and Fort Ellice, Manitoba. The transcontinental CPR paralleled this trail when coming through in the late 19th and early 20th centuries.

Provincial Highway 4, the precursor of the Trans–Canada Saskatchewan Highway 1 followed the surveyed grade of the transcontinental CPR between the Alberta and Manitoba border. Travel along Provincial Highway 4 before the 1940s would have been travelling on the square following the township road allowances, barbed wire fencing and rail lines.  As the surveyed township roads were the easiest to travel, the  first highway was designed on 90 degree right angle corners as the distance traversed the prairie along range roads and township roads.  Two horse then eight horse scrapers maintained these early dirt roads.

One of the problems that came about was when the Manitoba survey met the Saskatchewan survey. The Manitoba survey allowed for  road allowances placed east and west every .  This system was followed west of Manitoba until just north of Indian Head.  Whereas, the Saskatchewan survey conducted in 1887, allowed for   road allowances and placed roads east and west every .  The two surveys needed a  correction which took years to smooth out.

Agriculture is Saskatchewan's main industry and taking grain to elevators was first accomplished by horse and cart, to be replaced around World War I by truck travel. Long haul trucking flourished between 1950 and 1970, and the trans–Canada was completed across Canada by 1970.  Since the 1970s, 17 times the number of grain trucks and 95 per cent of goods transported now are hauled by truck across the Saskatchewan.

Speed limits

(Short stretches through the infrequent urban areas are at  though). Moose Jaw has 4 lane traffic bypassing the main portion of the city with a strictly enforced  speed limit with photo radar. After Regina, Highway 1 continues onward to Brandon and Winnipeg.

Communities

Alberta to Swift Current

Travelling west along the highway on the Alberta side, Highway 1 reaches Medicine Hat, Brooks, and Calgary. Travelling east, the highway begins near Walsh, Alberta and crosses into Saskatchewan entering into the Rural Municipality (R.M.) of Maple Creek, which was established December 10, 1917. (A rural municipality (R.M.) was an elected governing system providing essential services such as police, fire, health, education and infrastructure services for rural residents.  Historically, community residents could pay taxes or supply a couple days per quarter section labour constructing roads, bridges, and fireguards instead of paying taxes.) Maple Creek, a town of 2,198 residents (2006 census), was established in 1883 and is located  8 kilometres south of the Trans-Canada Highway 1 via Highway 21.

The next R.M. is Piapot No 110 and a ghost town of Sidewood an early ranching area of Saskatchewan. Sidewood served residents between 1911 and 1952. Piapot No 110 first provided infrastructure improvements for this rural area in 1913 and is now an administrative division for a rural population of 392 residents.  The small village of Piapot has a southerly access to Highway 1 also via Highway 614.

The village of Tompkins, and the town of Gull Lake are among the communities of R.M. of Gull Lake No 139. Both Tompkins with its  173 residents and Gull Lake serving 965 residents have their own municipal government. Gull Lake is an older community establishing its post office April 1, 1889. The south Saskatchewan region, an early ranching area was home to the 76 Ranch.  The ranch house, constructed in 1888, is now the Gull Lake School Division office.  Within Gull Lake No 139, which was created in 1913, are several wind turbine generators that can be seen when traversing the  Trans–Canada Highway.

Webb No 138 incorporated on December 13, 1909 providing road construction and maintenance. The post office was set up in Webb on March 1, 1908.

Swift Current to Moose Jaw
Swift Current No 137 becomes the next R.M. to travel through and here the unincorporated areas of Beverley and Java are the next communities along the route. Both of these communities are enumerated as a part of RM bringing its population to 1,587 residents.  December 12, 1910 saw the incorporation of the RM of Swift Current No 137. The highway runs through three cities on the way from Alberta to Manitoba, of which Swift Current is the first. Swift Current was first established in the North West Territories in 1883 and has risen to a population of 14,946.

The original route of this highway was via Chaplin Street through Swift Current. The Trans-Canada became a four lane expressway in 1968, and the new route went past Swift Current to the north.  Motels, shopping malls and fast food enterprises are located along the highway route. Subdivisions and neighbourhoods now extend past the highway, so again highway 1 traverses Swift Current.

Excelsior No 166 R.M. is the next rural governing body out of Swift Current that encompasses the community of Waldeck directly on Highway 1 at the junction of Saskatchewan Highway 628. Rush Lake is 4 kilometres north of the highway. 1903 first saw Rush Lake become established, soon followed in 1906 by Waldeck, and 1909 for the RM in this area.

The town of Herbert with its post office established in 1904 has 742 residents now. Herbert once renowned as having ‘The 
World’s Choicest Wheat Lands’ is at the junction of the Trans–Canada and Saskatchewan Highway 612. Morse, as well as Ernfold are unincorporated areas, which adds their populations to the 435 residents of R.M. Morse No 165. Morse is immediately north of Highway 1 at the intersection with Highway 644. The Morse Museum and Cultural Center celebrates pioneer history in a 1912 brick school house. Saskatchewan's third biggest grain marketing point in Saskatchewan as of 1912, continued on this route by setting a record for shipping 2-1/4 million bushels of wheat in 1915. Morse has erected large cattails for their roadside attraction. Ernfold is at the western edge of the separation of the east and west bound lanes of the Trans–Canada.

Uren is the first community arrived at within Chaplin No 164.  Uren bustled between 1911 and 1961.  Chaplin, at the intersection of Route 1 and Highways 19 and 58, was established in 1907. It is an unincorporated area that adds its population to the 138 residents (2006 census) of Chaplin No 164.  An American Avocet as well as Piping Plover are large statues built by the roadside commemorating the world-famous bird sanctuary at Chaplin, Saskatchewan.  Valjean, and Secretan are also too small to have their own municipal governments and they are located along the highway proper. Valjean supported a post office between 1912 and 1968, whereas Secretan's post office survived from 1911 to 1970.

Wheatlands No 163 established in 1909  features the communities of Parkbeg as well as Mortlach. Parkbeg, an unincorporated area, had a post office established in the North West Territories in 1896. The community also lays claim to being the hometown of Saskatchewan Roughriders mascot Gainer the Gopher. Parkbeg is now located on Trans–Canada 1 east, a segment that is 16.5 kilometres in length. Four major pipelines, TransCanada, Conoco, South Saskatchewan Pipeline, and Trans Gas find their home in Wheatlands RM.

There is only one community along the highway within R.M. Caron No 162, which is Caronport. The village of Caronport, 919 residents in 2006, did not receive a post office until 1947, but the RM was serving the area since 1912.  Local Improvement District (L.I.D.) #9 started making area improvements as early as 1904.

Moose Jaw to Regina

Moose Jaw, also called "Little Chicago", is a city of 33,665 (per the 2021 Census of Population) along the Trans–Canada. Capone's Car, Moose Family and Mac the Moose are all large roadside attractions of Moose Jaw.  Moose Jaw Trolley Company (1912) is still an operating electric cable trolleys offering tours of Moose Jaw. Temple Gardens Mineral Spa Resort, Tunnels of Moose Jaw, and History of Transportation Western Development Museum. are major sites of interest of this city.  The juncture of the Moose Jaw River and Thunder Creek produced the best source of water for steam engines, and Moose Jaw became the CPR divisional point.  AgPro Inland Grain Terminal operated by Saskatchewan Wheat Pool.  These large capacity concrete grain terminals are replacing the smaller grain elevators that were numerous along the highway, sentinels of most communities along the route.  Improved technology for harvest, transport and road construction have made the large inland terminals more viable economically. The rural governing body around Moose Jaw is Moose Jaw No. 161, which serves 1,228 residents (2006 census), which includes the Moose Jaw, Canadian Forces Base. Meat-processing plants, salt, potash, urea fertilizer, anhydrous ammonia and ethanol producers abound in this area with easy transport access to the Trans–Canada Highway.  
Belle Plaine, an unincorporated area, is within Pense No 160.  The RM serves only 490 residents as of 2006.

Regina

Sherwood No 159 is the R.M. of the western perimeter around Regina, Saskatchewan's capital and the second largest city with a 2016 population of approximately 215,000 people. Sherwood R.M. provides essential services to 1,075 residents. As Regina expands, it annexes land from Sherwood No 159.

The Trans-Canada Highway originally followed the Trans-Canada Highway Bypass (a controlled access highway also known as Ring Road), around the southeastern portion of the city and then exited at Victoria Avenue and continued east; a signed city route existed followed Albert Street and Victoria Avenue through downtown. As the city and congestion grew, especially to the east along Victoria Avenue which was an arterial road with traffic signals, a new bypass was required. The Regina Bypass, a partial ring road on the west, south, and east portions of Regina, opened in October 2019, and the Highway 1 designation was moved to the bypass. The Regina Bypass also serves a new route for Highway 11, the main route connecting to Saskatoon, Saskatchewan's largest city.

Regina to Manitoba 
Edenwold No 158 is the R.M. east of Regina comprising White City, as well as Balgonie along the highway proper.  Edenwold No 158 serves 3,611 residents.  As Regina grows eastward, it annexes land from this RM. White City a town of 1,113 residents could also be considered a census subdivision of Regina. Balgonie an unincorporated area first established its post office in 1883. It is now situated at the intersections of Saskatchewan Highway 46, 364, 10, and the Trans–Canada. As part of the Regina Bypass project, Highway 1 between Regina and Balgonie was upgraded to a controlled-access highway and is the longest freeway section in Saskatchewan.

St. Joseph's is a hamlet on Highway 1 and is a part of South Qu'appelle No 157, the next R.M. along the way.  The town of Qu'Appelle (624 residents in 2006) had historic beginnings with fur trading posts in this area, and is located within this R.M. Qu'Appelle was first named Troy, and was an administrative centre of the North West Territories.

Indian Head, a town with a population of 1,634, is within Indian Head No 156 along with the ghost town of Dingley and the town Sintaluta. Sintaluta has a population of  98. Indian Head has erected a large sculpture of an Indian Head at the side of the road.

This was a 1/2 mile by 1/2 mile (0.8 km by 0.8 km) farm.

Wolseley, a town of 782, is within the area of Wolseley No 155. The town of Wolseley is home to heritage properties such as the Provincial Court House building was constructed in 1893 and is the oldest surviving Court House building in the province. The Town Hall/Opera House, built in 1906 is a classic building and is used for all sorts of community events.  A 1904 Queen Anne revival-style home is now the Grenfell 'Adare' Museum. This home built by Mr. Edward Fitzgerald was built on a large property that was annexed by Grenfell.

Elcapo No 154 contains the urban communities of Grenfell, Oakshela and Broadview.  Grenfell has a population of  947, and Broadview  611. Grenfell is home to a 14,700 tonne inland concrete terminal as well as a large grain elevator located at the CPR line. Oakshela, an unincorporated area, is the only municipality served by the RM. The town of Broadview was an 1882 Canadian Pacific Railway divisional point. The Broadview Museum houses heritage of Broadview and area.

The town of Whitewood, 869 residents in 2006, was first established as Whitewood Station, North West Territories in 1883.  Dr. Rudolph Meyer led a group of French Counts to the area of Whitewood in the 1880s to develop a community similar to the communities for nobility in Europe.  Merchant's Bank Heritage Center is a heritage building of Whitewood, which celebrates its link to the French Counts of St. Hubert.  The next RM along the way is Willowdale No. 153, which nestles Percival and Burrows within its population.  Burrows is located at the junction of Highway 637. 

Wapella, an incorporated town, located within the Martin,  339 rural residents.

Next along the way are Moosomin, Saskatchewan, Rotave, and Fleming, Saskatchewan all within the  Moosomin No 121 R.M.  The town of Moosomin, Saskatchewan hosts 2,257 residents at the junction of Saskatchewan Highway 8, 1, and 709.

The Trans–Canada highway across Saskatchewan finally finishes up before the Manitoba-Saskatchewan border at Moosomin No. 121.

Geophysical features 
Highway 1 travels through geographical sites of interest as well as conservation areas. The highway begins in a mixed grassland ecoregion known as Maple Creek Plain. The Great Sand Hills are north of Highway 1 and the Cypress Hills region is south of the highway. The Cypress Hills Interprovincial Park features Fort Walsh and the highest elevation of Saskatchewan. Cypress Hills is accessed just 62 kilometres southwest of Highway 1. This area is known for its rolling with some steep hills and ravines.

Piapot Creek, Bear Creek, and Skull Creek are near the Wood Mountain Hills, also known as The Bench. After leaving the Maple Creek Plain, there is the Gull Lake Plain. Oil producing wells dot the landscape along with clumps of trees, sand hills, prairie grasses, and wind turbines producing wind energy.

Swift Current was founded as Rivière au Courant, which translates in English to Swift Current. The Swift Current Plateau is a prairie grasslands area. The Chaplin Plain is the next grassland ecoregion, and Highway 1 is just to the north of Chaplin Lake, which is situated on a huge bed of salt, producing a saline lake. The Western Hemispheric Shorebird Reserve a large shorebird conservation area is located on Chaplin Lake, and is renowned internationally. This area between Swift Current to Moose Jaw is considered to be part of the Missouri Coteau topographical area (extending south to the United States).

The area to the south of Parkbeg is termed the Coteau Hills. Besant Recreation Site and campground is located west of Caronport. The Dirt Hills, a grasslands ecoregion are west of Moose Jaw. The city of Moose Jaw arose at the junction of Moose Jaw River and Thunder Creek. The Wakamow Valley (administered by the Wakamow Valley Authority) has been developed with trails, playgrounds, and picnic areas.  Nicole Flats Nature Area (Buffalo Pound Provincial Park) is a preserved feature of the area. Both Moose Jaw and Regina are situated upon moist mixed grassland ecoregions, specifically called the Regina Plain. Regina is located south of the junction of the Wascana and Qu'Appelle Rivers, and the area is now called Wascana Lake. Aspen parkland prairie is east of Regina. The Moose Mountain Upland ecoregion is east of Regina and south of the Qu'Appelle River.

Fairly Lake is located within the town of Wolseley. The lake was created because the CPR dammed up Wolf Creek to provide water for steam locomotives. Grenfell Regional Park is located west of Grenfell.

Echo Valley and Katepwa Point are two neighbouring provincial parks near Broadview. Kipling Plain gives rise to the topographical feature called the Squirrel Hills and further to the east the Wood Hills. Moosomin Lake Regional Park, is located to the south of the Trans-Canada Highway in the Pipestone Valley on the shores of Moosomin Lake. The Melville Plain is the remaining ecoregion along the Trans-Canada Highway before the Manitoba border.

Major intersections
Unlike most other North American jurisdictions, exit numbers on east-west highways are numbered from east to west (ie, in the case of Saskatchewan, starting at Zero at the Manitoba border, and increasing when moving westwards to Alberta.

Books
Prairie Memories.  Webb History Book Committee.  Webb, Saskatchewan: Webb History Book Committee, 1982.

See also
 List of Saskatchewan provincial highways

References

External links

 Saskatchewan #1 Trans–Canada Highway Mile by Mile
Saskatchewan Highways Website–Highway Numbering  Homestead
Saskatchewan Road Map RV Itineraries  MilebyMile
Big Things of Canada, A Celebration of Community Monuments of Canada . Big Things
Navigating the Trans–Canada Highway
Online Historical Map Digitization Project Rootsweb
Saskatchewan City & Town Maps*Saskatchewan's Highway Network Government of Saskatchewan
Trans–Canada Highway. The Canadian Encyclopedia
Trans–Canada Highway
Trans–Canada Highway Act
Trans–Canada Netword
Trans–Canada Highway Transport Canada

001
Saskatchewan 001
001
Roads in Regina, Saskatchewan
Transport in Swift Current
Transport in Moose Jaw